Roger Brereton  was a Welsh politician who sat in the House of Commons from 1604 to 1611

Brereton the third son of Owen Brereton of Borras near Gresford, Denbighshire.

He sat on the bench as Justice of the Peace for Flintshire from 1582 to 1617 and for Shropshire from 1598 to at least 1604. He was appointed High Sheriff of Flintshire for 1591–92.

In 1604, he was elected Member of Parliament for Flint.

Brereton possibly married Katherine Fulleshurst, widow of Edward Fulleshurst and daughter of Sir William. Brereton of Brereton, Lord Chief Justice of Ireland by his second  wife.

References

Year of birth missing
Year of death missing
Members of the Parliament of England (pre-1707) for constituencies in Wales
People from Flint, Flintshire
17th-century Welsh politicians
High Sheriffs of Flintshire
English MPs 1604–1611